Agra Kuz or Agra is a town and union council of Charsadda District in Khyber Pakhtunkhwa province of Pakistan. It is located at 34°6'54N 71°41'51E and has an altitude of 273 metres (898 feet).

References

Union councils of Charsadda District
Populated places in Charsadda District, Pakistan